is a J-drama Japanese television series starring Tatsuya Fujiwara as . The main character's identity cards are stolen and he loses his property. He has to find who is responsible and a way to get his life back. Fujiawara stated that "I really think the characters are brilliantly written and portrayed because the viewers won’t be able to easily see their true colors and guess who’s actually evil."

Lost ID airs in Singapore on Gem TV.

References

External links
 Lost ID official site at NTV 

Japanese television series